Hilarographa calyx is a species of moth of the family Tortricidae. It is found in Taiwan.

The wingspan is about 14 mm. The ground colour of the forewings is cream, consisting of transverse dorsal lines, weak basal streaks and costal lines. The terminal fourth of the wing is rust orange. The hindwings are brown, but rather cream in the proximal half of the median cell.

Etymology
The name refers to the shape of anteostial sterigma and is derived from Latin calyx (meaning a cup).

References

Moths described in 2009
Hilarographini